Major General Stanley Woodburn Kirby,  (13 February 1895 − 19 July 1968) was a British Army officer who served in both World Wars.

Personal
Stanley Kirby was the son of Sir Woodburn Kirby, born in the Hendon district of London. He was educated at Charterhouse School. Kirby was married twice; first in 1924 to Rosabel Gell who died in 1954 – the couple had one son. His second marriage was in 1955 to Mrs Joan Catherine.

Career
Kirby was commissioned into the Royal Engineers on 17 July 1914 and served during the First World War in Egypt (1915), France (21 February to 21 October 1915) and Macedonia (1 December 1915 to 7 September 1917). He was mentioned in despatches and awarded the Military Cross and Bar and finished the war as a captain. He was Assistant Instructor in Survey, School of Military Engineering from 24 May 1920 until 15 July 1923 and served in Singapore between 1923 and 1926. He studied at the Staff College, Camberley from 1927 to 1928. From 9 February 1931 until 18 February 1935, he served as a General Staff Officer at the Directorate of Military Operations and Intelligence, War Office, starting as a General Staff Officer, 3rd grade (GSO3) and then as 2nd grade (GSO2).

He studied at the Imperial Defence College in 1936. From October 1937 until 1943, Kirby served at General Headquarters, India, first as Assistant Master-General of Ordnance, then as Deputy Master-General of Ordnance (from 13 March 1940). He was Director of Staff Duties from 1 October 1941 and became Deputy Chief of the General Staff, India, in 1942. Kirby returned to Britain and he was appointed as Director of Civil Affairs, at the War Office in June 1943, until April 1944. In 1945, he was Deputy Chief of Staff (Organisation), British Element, Control Commission for Germany. Working as a historian from 1950, he was a joint author of The War Against Japan, the volumes in the official history series History of the Second World War on the war in the Far East.

Awards and decorations
 Companion of the Order of the Bath (2 June 1943) 
 Companion of the Order of St Michael and St George (1 January 1947)
 Companions of the Order of the Indian Empire (11 June 1940)
 Officer of the Order of the British Empire (Military Division) (3 June 1927)
 Military Cross and bar (14 January 1916 and 4 October 1919)
 1914–15 Star
 British War Medal 1914–1920
 Victory Medal
 Mention in Despatches (1 January 1916)
 Grand Officer of the Order of Orange Nassau, with Swords (Netherlands)
 Commander of the Legion of Merit (US, 14 May 1948)
 Commander of the Order of the Crown (Belgium)

Citation for second Military Cross: Attached 46th (North Midland) Divisional Signal Company, R.E., T.F., attd. R.A., 46th Divisional H.Q.: Near Bellenglise, on 2 October 1918, and two following days, he worked night and day under very trying conditions, and was mainly instrumental in keeping the Signal communications of the 46th Division through during the attack on Ramicourt and Montbrehain. His efficiency, courage and enthusiasm were a fine example to those under him.

References

Bibliography

External links
British Army Officers 1939−1945
Generals of World War II

1895 births
1968 deaths
War Office personnel in World War II
British Army generals of World War II
British Army major generals
British Army personnel of World War I
Military personnel from Middlesex
People from Hendon
People educated at Charterhouse School
Royal Engineers officers
Companions of the Order of the Bath
Companions of the Order of St Michael and St George
Companions of the Order of the Indian Empire
Officers of the Order of the British Empire
Recipients of the Military Cross
Grand Officers of the Order of Orange-Nassau
Commanders of the Legion of Merit
Commanders of the Order of the Crown (Belgium)
Graduates of the Staff College, Camberley
Graduates of the Royal College of Defence Studies